Danielithosia difficilis is a moth of the family Erebidae. It is found in China (Guangdong).

The forewings are buff with a diffuse yellow costal margin. The hindwings are lighter than the forewing, without any darkening. In females, the hindwings are lighter than in males.

References

External links

Moths described in 2012
Endemic fauna of China
Lithosiina